The Bafing National Park lies in southern Mali. It was established on 1 July 2000. This site is 5000 km². Bafing National Park is the only protected area for chimpanzees within the Manding Plateau area. Woodlands dominate most of the landscape. Both Korofin and Wongo National Park (both IUCN category: II) are components of the Bafing Biosphere.

References

National parks of Mali
Protected areas established in 2000
2000 establishments in Mali